Nassau-Usingen was a county of the Holy Roman Empire in the Upper Rhenish Circle that became a principality in 1688.

The origin of the county lies in the medieval county of Weilnau that was acquired by the counts of Nassau-Weilburg in 1602.
That county was divided in 1629 into the lines of Nassau-Weilburg, Nassau-Idstein and Nassau-Saarbrücken that was divided only 30 years later in 1659.

The emerging counties were Nassau-Saarbrücken, Nassau-Ottweiler and Nassau-Usingen. At the beginning of the 18th century, three of the Nassau lines died out and Nassau-Usingen became their successor (1721 Nassau-Idstein, 1723 Nassau-Ottweiler und 1728 Nassau-Saarbrücken).
In 1735 Nassau-Usingen was divided again into Nassau-Usingen and Nassau-Saarbrücken. In 1797 Nassau-Usingen inherited Nassau-Saarbrücken.

On July 17, 1806, the counties of Nassau-Usingen and Nassau-Weilburg joined the Confederation of the Rhine. Under pressure from Napoleon both counties merged to become the Duchy of Nassau on August 30, 1806, under joint rule of Prince Frederick August of Nassau-Usingen and his younger cousin Prince Frederick William of Nassau-Weilburg. As Frederick August had no heirs, he agreed that Frederick William should become sole ruler after his death. However, Frederick William died from a fall on the stairs at Schloss Weilburg on 9 January 1816, and it was his son William who became duke of a unified Nassau.

The title has been carried in pretense by Prince Frederick August's half-brother Karl Philip's line.

List of rulers

See also
House of Nassau
Duchy of Nassau
House of Nassau-Weilburg

Sources 
The Dutch Nassau-Usingen and the German Nassau-Usingen Wikipedia articles
The German webpage Fürstentum Nassau-Usingen
The divisions of the House of Nassau

German noble families
Former states and territories of Rhineland-Palatinate